Charles Harper Bennett (born 1840 in London, died 1927 in Sydney) was an English photographic pioneer.

He improved the gelatin silver process developed by Richard Leach Maddox, first in 1873 by a method of hardening the emulsion, making it more resistant to friction, and later in 1878 Bennett discovered that by prolonged heating the sensitivity of the emulsion could be greatly increased. This increased sensitivity resulting enabled shooting at 1/25 second, paving the way for the snapshot.

References 

1840 births
1927 deaths
English inventors
19th-century English photographers